Xanthaciura major is a species of tephritid or fruit flies in the genus Xanthaciura of the family Tephritidae.

Distribution
Peru.

References

Tephritinae
Insects described in 1934
Diptera of South America